Plute may refer to:
 Plutonium
 Plute, an informal term for a plutocrat in the context of Industrial Workers of the World philosophy and tactics
 Plute or pluteus, a moveable shield used alongside siege engines in ancient Roman warfare

People with the name
 Vilis Olavs or Vilis Plute (1867–1917), Latvian political theorist, writer, and humanitarian
 Ronald Plute, American soccer player and former player with DFW Tornado
 Sandy Plute, a songwriter contributor to the soundtrack of Wild Wild West
 Plute Pete, performer at the Village Barn

Fictional
 Max Plute, a character in The Nth Commandment

See also
 Piute (disambiguation)
 Ploot (disambiguation)
 Pulte (disambiguation)